HD Hyundai is one of the largest South Korean conglomerates engaged in shipbuilding, heavy equipment, machine, and petroleum. 

HD Hyundai started its shipbuilding business in a small village in Ulsan, South Korea, in 1972 and grew into a global heavy industries company. It is a major supplier in the heavy industries and energy sector, ranging from shipbuilding and marine engineering to oil refining, petrochemicals, and smart energy management businesses.

HD Hyundai rebranded its name of Hyundai Heavy Industries Group(HHI Group) to 'HD Hyundai' in 2022 to mark its 50th anniversary.

Businesses
HD Hyundai operates three core businesses - shipbuilding, heavy equipment, and energy - through Korea Shipbuilding & Offshore Engineering (KSOE), Hyundai Genuine, and Hyundai Oilbank. Korea Shipbuilding & Offshore Engineering (KSOE) is a sub-holding company that controls the group's shipbuilding companies, including Hyundai Heavy Industries, Hyundai Samho Heavy Industries, and Hyundai Mipo Dockyard. Hyundai Genuine is another sub-holding company that oversees heavy equipment business, having Hyundai Doosan Infracore and Hyundai Construction Equipment as subsidiaries. Hyundai Oilbank is one of the four major oil refiners in South Korea, along with SK Energy, GS Caltex, and S-Oil.

See also
 Asan Medical Center
 Munhwa Ilbo
 Ulsan Hyundai FC

References

External links
 

Conglomerate companies of South Korea
Chaebol
Hyundai
Engine manufacturers of South Korea
Automotive transmission makers
Forklift truck manufacturers
Truck manufacturers of South Korea
Electrical generation engine manufacturers
Gas engine manufacturers
Diesel engine manufacturers
Marine engine manufacturers
Photovoltaics manufacturers
Electrical equipment manufacturers
Electrical engineering companies of South Korea
Electric transformer manufacturers
Construction equipment manufacturers of South Korea